Lena...Lovely and Alive is a 1962 studio album by Lena Horne, arranged by Marty Paich and featuring trumpeter Jack Sheldon.

At the 5th Grammy Awards, Horne was nominated for the Grammy Award for Best Solo Vocal Performance, Female for her performance on this album. A Grammy was awarded to Robert Jones, Art Director for the Best Album Cover—Non-Classical.

Track listing
"I Concentrate on You" (Cole Porter) - 2:42
"I Get the Blues When It Rains" (Marcy Klauber, Harry Stoddard) - 3:41
"I've Grown Accustomed to His Face"  (Frederick Loewe, Alan Jay Lerner) - 3:57
"I Got Rhythm" (George Gershwin, Ira Gershwin) - 2:51
"I’m Confessin’ (That I Love You)" (Doc Daugherty, Ellis Reynolds, Al J. Neiburg) - 3:25
"I Want to Be Happy" (Vincent Youmans, Irving Caesar)
"I Surrender, Dear" (Harry Barris, Gordon Clifford)
"I've Found a New Baby" (Jack Palmer, Spencer Williams) 
"I Understand" (Mabel Wayne, Kim Gannon) - 3:44
"I Let a Song Go Out of My Heart" (Duke Ellington, Irving Mills, Henry Nemo, and John Redmond) - 2:43
"I Ain't Got Nobody" (Spencer Williams)
"I Only Have Eyes for You" (Harry Warren, Al Dubin)

Personnel
Lena Horne - vocals
Bill Pitman - guitar
Joe Mondragon - bass
Gene DiNovi - piano
Frank Capp, Shelly Manne - drums
Bill Perkins, Joe Maini - saxophone
Jack Sheldon, Pete Candoli - trumpet
Bob Enevoldsen, Frank Rosolino - trombone
Marty Paich - orchestrations

References

RCA Victor albums
Albums arranged by Marty Paich
Lena Horne albums
1962 albums